Vester Hjermitslev is a village in North Jutland, Denmark. It is located in Jammerbugt Municipality.

Notable residents 
 Helle Juul (born 1954), architect

References

Cities and towns in the North Jutland Region
Jammerbugt Municipality
Villages in Denmark